Dumbrăveni (before 1945 Ibașfalău; ; Saxon dialect: Eppeschdorf) is a town in the north of Sibiu County, in the centre of Transylvania, central Romania. The town administers two villages, Ernea (Ehrgang; Argung; Szászernye) and Șaroș pe Târnave (Scharosch an der kokel; Šuerš; Szászsáros).

Geography
It is situated on the Transylvanian Plateau, on the border with Mureș County, midway between Mediaș and Sighișoara. 

The town is crossed on its southern edge by National Road , which connects Sibiu to Sighișoara. There is also a train station that serves Line 300 of the CFR network, which connects Bucharest with the Hungarian border near Oradea.

The Șaroș gas field is located on the territory of Dumbrăveni.

Demographics 

According to the 2011 Romanian census, 71.1% of inhabitants were Romanians, 18.4% Roma, 9.2% Hungarians, and 1% Germans (more specifically Transylvanian Saxons).

Natives
Virgil Atanasiu
Árpád Szabó

Education

There are two secondary schools in this town: the Dumbrăveni Theoretical High School and the Timotei Cipariu High School.

See also

Gallery

References

Towns in Romania
Populated places in Sibiu County
Localities in Transylvania
Monotowns in Romania
Armenian communities in Romania